Nicolaas Alphonsus Petrus "Nico" de Bree (16 September 1944 – 6 May 2016) was a Dutch footballer who played as a goalkeeper.

Club career
De Bree started his professional career at local club Elinkwijk and moved to N.E.C. in 1966. After playing 204 matches for the Nijmegen club, he moved abroad to play in Belgium and won the 1975 league title with RWDM and the 1978 UEFA Cup Winners' Cup with Anderlecht. He also played for Winterslag and Beerschot.

He finished his career with DS'79 in 1984.

Personal life
After retiring as a player, de Bree owned two nightclubs and was a goalkeeper coach. He was the goalkeeper coach of China national team in 2004.

Death
He died of cancer in Vienna.

Honours

Player

RWD Molenbeek 

 Belgian First Division: 1974–75
 Jules Pappaert Cup: 1975
 Amsterdam Tournament: 1975

 
 RSC Anderlecht

 European Cup Winners' Cup: 1977–78 (winners)
 European Super Cup: 1978
Tournoi de Paris: 1977
 Jules Pappaert Cup: 1977
 Belgian Sports Merit Award: 1978

References

1944 births
2016 deaths
Footballers from Utrecht (city)
Association football goalkeepers
Dutch footballers
USV Elinkwijk players
NEC Nijmegen players
R.W.D. Molenbeek players
R.S.C. Anderlecht players
K.F.C. Winterslag players
K. Beerschot V.A.C. players
FC Dordrecht players
Dutch expatriate footballers
Expatriate footballers in Belgium
Dutch expatriate sportspeople in Belgium
Dutch expatriate sportspeople in China
Deaths from cancer in Austria